Carole Rifkind (June 23, 1935 – July 22, 2019) was an American architecture critic, architectural historian, author, educator and filmmaker. Her books concern architectural history as well as the negotiation between the built environment and people within the urban landscape.

Biography
Carole Lewis was born in Brooklyn, New York. She studied at Mount Holyoke College and Barnard College, graduating from the latter in 1956. The same year she married Richard Rifkind.

She taught at Columbia Graduate School of Architecture, Planning and Preservation and directed programs for the Hudson River Museum, the Municipal Art Society and Partners for Livable Places. She was also a consultant on historic preservation and tourism planning.

In 2011, she and her husband set up a Faculty Support Fund at Barnard, to assist teachers in the early years of their career.

Publications

Books
(with Carol Levine) Mansions, Mills, and Main Streets. New York: Schocken Books, 1975. 
Main Street: the Face of Urban America. New York: Harper & Row, 1977. 
A Field Guide to American Architecture. New York: New American Library, 1980. 
Tourism and Communities: Process, Problems, and Solutions. Washington, D.C.: Partners for Livable Places, 1981.
A Field Guide to Contemporary American Architecture. New York: Dutton, 1998.

Articles
"America's Fantasy Urbanism: The Waxing of the Mall and the Waning of Civility," in: Dumbing Down: Essays on the Strip Mining of American Culture edited by Katharine Washburn and John F. Thornton. New York: W.W. Norton, 1996. 
"Are We Getting What We Deserve?" (with ...), Oculus 61 no. 4 (Dec. 1998), p. 8–9.
"Building Character," Metropolitan Home vol. 27, no. 5 (Sept.-Oct. 1995) p. 132–137. (Renovation of the author's eastern Long Island home)
"Cultural Tourism: a New Opportunity for the Industrial City," Environmental Comment (Jan. 1981), p. 4–7.
"Examining the 'First American City': SAH tours Pittsburgh," Society of Architectural Historians Newsletter vol. 38, no. 1 (Feb. 1994), p. 1, 3–4, 15.
"Faking It," Metropolis vol. 17, no. 5 (Dec. 1997-Jan. 1998), p. 66–67, 83, 85. (Review of Ada Louise Huxtable's Unreal America (1997)
"How to Read an Old House," Historic preservation vol. 40, no. 1 (Jan.-Feb. 1998), p. 44–47.
"Plying the Waters," Metropolis vol. 9, no. 3 (Oct. 1989), p. 90–95. (Concerning the revival of ferry service in New York City)
[Untitled article concerning the Milan Metro], New York Times (May 23, 1982), p. 482.

Filmography
The Venetian Dilemma (2004)
Naturally Obsessed: the Making of a Scientist (2009)

References

1935 births
People from Brooklyn
American architecture writers
Barnard College alumni
Columbia Graduate School of Architecture, Planning and Preservation alumni
20th-century American women writers
New York University alumni
Filmmakers from New York (state)
2019 deaths
21st-century American women